The right of non-citizens to vote in the United States has historically been a contentious issue. Since 1997, the Illegal Immigration Reform and Immigrant Responsibility Act of 1996 has prohibited non-citizens from voting in federal elections, with the threat of fines, imprisonment, inadmissibility and deportation. Exempt from punishment is any noncitizen who, at the time of voting, had two natural or adoptive U.S. citizen parents, who began permanently living in the United States before turning 16 years old, and who reasonably believed that they were a citizen of the United States. At one point or another before 1926 40 states had non-citizens voting in elections. While federal law does not prohibit noncitizens from voting in state or local elections, no state has allowed noncitizens to vote in statewide elections since Arkansas became the last state to outlaw noncitizen voting in state elections in 1926. As of December 2022, at least thirteen local jurisdictions allow non-citizen voting, namely Winooski and Montpelier in Vermont, and eleven in Maryland near Washington, D.C. Additionally, the U.S. territories of American Samoa and the Northern Mariana Islands allow non-citizen US nationals to vote.

Discussion 
Jamie Raskin, an American law professor and politician, has argued that the blanket exclusion of noncitizens from the ballot is neither constitutionally required nor historically normal. A San Francisco State University political science professor and rights activist, Ron Hayduk, wrote in 2006 a book entitled Democracy For All: Restoring Immigrant Voting Rights in the United States, presenting additional elements of the historical and present reality of noncitizens voting rights in the United States. In 2017 Joe Matthews, Connecting California columnist and California editor at Zócalo Public Square, an Ideas Exchange that is a project of New America and Arizona State University, called for universal suffrage.

Pre-1926
While initial research showed that 22 states or territories, including colonies before the Declaration of Independence, have at some time given at least some voting rights to non-citizens in some or all elections, more recent and in-depth studies uncovered evidence of 40 states providing suffrage for non-citizens at some point before 1926. For example, in 1875, the Supreme Court in Minor v. Happersett noted that "citizenship has not in all cases been made a condition precedent to the enjoyment of the right of suffrage. Thus, in Missouri, persons of foreign birth, who have declared their intention to become citizens of the United States, may under certain circumstances vote."

By 1900, nearly half of the states and territories had some experience with voting by non-citizens, and for some the experience lasted more than half a century. At the turn of the twentieth century, anti-immigration feeling ran high, and Alabama stopped allowing non-citizens to vote by way of a constitutional change in 1901; Colorado followed suit in 1902, Wisconsin in 1908, and Oregon in 1914. Just as the nationalism unleashed by the War of 1812 helped to reverse the non-citizen suffrage policies inherited from the late eighteenth century, World War I caused a sweeping retreat from the progressive non-citizen suffrage policies of the late nineteenth century. In 1918, Kansas, Nebraska, and South Dakota all changed their constitutions to purge non-citizen suffrage, and Texas ended the practice of noncitizen voting in primary elections by statute. Indiana and Texas joined the trend in 1921, followed by Mississippi in 1924 and, finally, Arkansas in 1926. In 1931, political scientist Leon Aylsworth noted that "[f]or the first time in over a hundred years, a national election was held in 1928 in which no alien in any state had the right to cast a vote for a candidate for any office – national, state, or local."

No citizenship requirement for suffrage

Connecticut
1776–1819

Delaware
1776–1831

Illinois
 Article 27 of the 1818 Illinois Constitution: "In all elections, all white male inhabitants above the age of 21 years, having resided in the state six months next preceding the election, shall enjoy the right of an elector"
 1848: end of non-citizen suffrage by constitutional amendment, but noncitizens who were present in 1848 were grandfathered.

Kentucky
1789–1799

Maryland
1776–1851

Massachusetts
1780 Massachusetts Constitution:
Article IV (Chapter I., Section III. House of Representatives) : "Every male person, being twenty-one years of age, and resident in any particular town in this Commonwealth for the space of one year next preceding, having a freehold estate within the same town, of the annual income of three pounds, or any estate of the value of sixty pounds, shall have a right to vote in the choice of a Representative or Representatives for the said town."
Article II (Chapter I, Section II. Senate): "every male inhabitant of twenty-one years of age and upwards, having a freehold estate within the Commonwealth, of the annual income of three pounds, or any estate of the value of sixty pounds, shall have a right to give in his vote for the Senators for the district of which he is an inhabitant. And to remove all doubts concerning the meaning of the word "inhabitant" in this constitution, every person shall be considered as an inhabitant, for the purpose of electing and being elected into any office, or place within this State, in that town, district, or plantation, where he dwelleth, or hath his home."

New Hampshire
1792–1814

New Jersey
1776–1820

New York
1777 New York State Constitution, Article VII: "[E]very male inhabitant of full age, who shall have personally resided within one of the counties 
of this State for six months immediately preceding the day of election, shall, at such election, be entitled to vote for representatives of the said county in assembly; if, during the time aforesaid, he shall have been a freeholder, possessing a freehold of the value of twenty pounds, within the said county, or have 
rented a tenement therein of the yearly value of forty shillings, and been rated and actually paid taxes to this State: Provided always, That every person who now is a freeman of the city of Albany, or who was made a freeman of the city of New York on or before the fourteenth day of October, in the year of our 
Lord one thousand seven hundred and seventy-five, and shall be actually and usually resident in the said cities, respectively, shall be entitled to vote for representatives in assembly within his said place of residence."

1776–1804

North Carolina
1704–1856

Northwest Territory

Ohio
1802 Constitution: "In all elections, all white male inhabitants above the age of twenty-one years, having resided in the State one year next preceding the election, and who have paid or are charged with a State or county tax, shall enjoy the right of an elector"
1851: end of non-citizen voting rights

Pennsylvania
1776 Constitution: "all free men having a sufficient evident common interest with, and attachment to the community, have a right to elect officers, or to be elected into office"
1790 Constitution (Art. III section 1.): "In elections by the citizens, every freeman of the age of twenty-one years, having resided in the State two years next before the election, and within that time paid a State or county tax, which shall have been assessed at least six months before the election, shall enjoy the rights of an elector: Provided, That the sons of persons qualified asaforesaid, between the ages of twenty-one and twenty-two years, shall be entitled to vote, although they shall not have paid taxes."
1838 Constitution (Art. III, section 1.): "In elections by the citizens, every white freeman of the age of twenty-one years, having resided in this State one year, and in the election-district where he offers to vote ten days immediately preceding such election, and within two years paid a State or county tax, which shall have been assessed at least ten days before the election, shall enjoy the rights of an elector. ..."
1874 Constitution (Article VIII, section 1.): "Every male citizen twenty-one years of age, possessing the following qualifications, shall be entitled to vote at all elections: First—He shall have been a citizen of the United States at least one month. ..."

Rhode Island
1762–1842

South Carolina
1790–?

Tennessee
1796–1834

Vermont
1776 and 1786 Constitutions: "all freemen. having a sufficient, evident, common interest with, and attachment to the community, have a right to elect officers, or be elected into office."
1793 Constitution (Section 21st): "Every man of the full age of twenty one years, having resided in this State for the space of one whole year next before the election of Representatives, and is of a quiet and peaceable behaviour, and will take the following oath or affirmation, shall be entitled to all the privileges of a freeman of this State. "You solemnly swear (or affirm) that whenever you give your vote or suffrage, touching any matter that concerns the State of Vermont, you will do it so as in your conscience you shall judge will most conduce to the best good of the same, as established by the constitution, without fear or favour of any man." "
1828: end of non-citizen suffrage for federal elections; but still up to 1977 for local elections.

Virginia
1776 Virginia Bill of Rights: "all men, having sufficient evidence of permanent common interest with, and attachment to, the community, have the right of suffrage"
1850: end of non-citizen voting rights

Suffrage for those who intend to become citizens

Alabama
1868: "Every male person, born in the United States, and every male person who has been naturalized, or who has legally declared his intention to become a citizen of the United States, twenty-one years old or upward, who shall have resided in this State six months next preceding the election, and three months in the county in which he offers to vote, except as hereinafter provided, shall be deemed an elector"
1901: "Every male citizen of this state who is a citizen of the United States, and every male resident of foreign birth, who, before the ratification of this Constitution, shall have legally declared his intention to become a citizen of the United States, twenty-one years old or upwards, not laboring under any of the disabilities named in this article, and possessing the qualifications required by it, shall be an elector, and shall be entitled to vote at any election by the people; provided, that all foreigners who have legally declared their intention to become citizens of the United States, shall, if they fail to become citizens thereof at the time they are entitled to become such, cease to have the right to vote until they become such citizens"

Arkansas
1874: "Every male citizen of the United States, or male person who has declared his intention of becoming a citizen of the same, of the age of twenty-one years, who has resided in the State twelve months, and in the county six months, and in the voting precinct or ward one month, next preceding any election, where he may propose to vote, shall be entitled to vote at all elections by the people."
1926: end of non-citizen voting rights

Colorado
1876–1902

Florida
1868: "Every male person of the age of twenty-one years and upwards, of whatever race, color, nationality, or previous condition, who shall, at the time of offering to vote, be a citizen of the United States, or who shall have declared his intention to become such in conformity to the laws of the United States, and who shall have resided and had his habitation, domicil, home, and place of permanent abode in Florida for one year, and in the county for six months, next preceding the election at which he shall offer to vote, shall in such county be deemed a qualified elector at all elections under this Constitution."
1894: end of non-citizen voting rights

Georgia
1868 "Every male person born in the United States and every male person who has been naturalized, or who has legally declared his intention to become a citizen of the United States, twenty-one years old or upward, who shall have resided in this State six months next preceding the election, and shall have resided thirty days in the county in which he offers to vote, and shall have paid all taxes which may have been required of him, and which he may have had an opportunity of paying, agreeably to law, for the year next preceding the election (except as hereinafter provided), shall be deemed an elector"
1877: end of non-citizen voting rights

Idaho
1863–1890

Indiana
1851: "In all elections, not otherwise provided for by this Constitution, every white male citizen of the United States, of the age of twenty-one years and upwards, who shall have resided in the State during the six months immediately preceding such election; and every white male, of foreign birth, of the age of twenty-one years and upwards, who shall have resided in the United States one year, and shall have resided in the State during the six months immediately preceding such election, and shall have declared his intention to become a citizen of the United States, conformably to the laws of the United States on the subject of naturalization; shall be entitled to vote, in the township or precinct where he may reside."; "No Negro or Mulatto shall have the right of suffrage"
1921: end of non-citizen voting rights

Kansas
1859: "Every white male person, of twenty-one years and upward, belonging to either of the following classes, who shall have resided in Kansas six months next preceding any election, and in the township or ward in which he offers to vote at least thirty days next preceding such election, shall be deemed a qualified elector: First, Citizens of the United States. Second, Persons of foreign birth who shall have declared their intention to become citizens, conformably to the laws of the United States on the subject of naturalization."
1918: end of non-citizen voting rights

Louisiana
1879–?

Michigan
1850: "In all elections, every male inhabitant of this State, being a citizen of the United States, every male inhabitant residing in this State on the twenty-fourth day of June, eighteen hundred and thirty-five, every male inhabitant residing in this State on the first day of January, eighteen hundred and fifty, every male inhabitant of foreign birth who, having resided in the State two years and six months prior to the eighth day of November, eighteen hundred and ninety-four, and having declared his intention to become a citizen of the United States two years and six months prior to said last named day, and every civilized male inhabitant of Indian descent, a native of the United States and not a member of any tribe, shall be an elector and entitled to vote; but no one shall be an elector or entitled to vote at any election unless he shall be above the age of twenty-one years, and has resided in this State six month, and in the township or ward in which he offers to vote, twenty days next preceding such election"
1894: end of non-citizen voting rights

Minnesota
1849–1898
1857–1898

Mississippi
never
up to 1924

Missouri
1865–1921

Montana
1864–1889

Nebraska
1854–1918

Nevada
1848–1864

North Dakota
1889-1889/1909

Oklahoma
1850–1907

Oregon
1848–1914

South Dakota
1850–1918

Texas
1876: "Every male person subject to none of the foregoing disqualifications, who shall have attained the age of twenty-one years, and who shall be a citizen of the United States, and who shall have resided in this State one year next preceding an election, and the last six months within the district or county in which he offers to vote, shall be deemed a qualified elector; and every male person of foreign birth, subject to none of the foregoing disqualifications, who, at any time before an election, shall have declared his intention to become a citizen of the United States, in accordance with the federal naturalization laws, and shall have resided in this State one year next preceding such election, and the last six months in the county in which he offers to vote, shall also be deemed a qualified elector"
1921

Washington
(1853–1889)

Wisconsin
1848: "Every male person of the age of twenty-one years, or upwards, of the following classes, who shall have resided in this State for one year next preceding any election, shall be deemed a qualified elector at such election. 1st. White citizens of the United States 2d. White persons of foreign birth who shall have declared their intention to become citizens conformably to the laws of the United States on the subject of naturalization ..."; "No person shall be eligible to the legislature, who shall not have resided one year within the state, and be a qualified elector in the district he may be chosen to represent."
1908

Wyoming
(1850–1889)

American Samoa & the Northern Mariana Islands

Unlike the United States's other self-governing territories, American Samoa, an unincorporated, unorganized territory of the United States since 1900, has not been given jus soli birthright citizenship either by incorporation or act of Congress for those born in its borders. As a result, people born in American Samoa or any United States Minor Outlying Islands are not given automatic US citizenship but have instead been given US nationality without citizenship.

Residents of the Northern Mariana Islands gained automatic US citizenship via the Covenant with the United States in November 1986, but also have the option (prior to reaching the age of 18) to reject US citizenship and accept non-citizen US nationality instead.

Under American Samoa law and Northern Mariana Islands law, both US citizens and non-citizen nationals may register to vote, making them the only jurisdictions at the state or territorial level that allow non-citizens to vote and making their delegates the only members of Congress voted for by non-citizens (though those members cannot themselves vote in Congress, because territories are not represented there in the Constitution).

21st century

Only citizens clause

As of January 14, 2023, eight state constitutions explicitly require citizenship for voting:
 Alabama, approved by referendum in 2020
 Arizona
 California, judge interpretation of state constitution in 2022
 Colorado, approved by referendum in 2020
 Florida, approved by referendum in 2020
 Louisiana, approved by referendum in 2022
 North Dakota, approved by referendum in 2018
 Ohio, approved by referendum in 2022

California
On October 28, 2015, Governor Jerry Brown signed a bill into law that automatically registers all citizen resident holders of a driver's license as a registered voter for all California ballots, including federal elections. Opponents expressed concern this could offer suffrage rights to noncitizen residents, since a January 2015 legislation decreed the right of a driver's license to noncitizens. However, as the Sacramento Bee pointed out, "people will need to attest they're citizens before being able to register," "undocumented immigrants applying for driver's licenses, a right they gained this year, will not be offered the option."  Citizenship status is verified at the DMV when applying for a license.

While voting as a noncitizen in a federal election carries legal penalties, California Assembly Bill No. 1461 removes legal ramifications from the State of California for individuals that accurately represent themselves and the DMV incorrectly registers the individual to vote, which means a failure on the DMV clerk or system to properly execute the process of verifying the voter registration information for the individual:

"Existing law makes it a crime for a person to willfully cause, procure, or allow himself or herself or any other person to be registered as a voter, knowing that he or she or that other person is not entitled to registration. Existing law also makes it a crime to fraudulently vote or attempt to vote.

This bill would provide that if a person who is ineligible to vote becomes registered to vote by operation of the California New Motor Voter Program in the absence of a violation by that person of the crime described above, that person's registration shall be presumed to have been effected with official authorization and not the fault of that person. The bill would also provide that if a person who is ineligible to vote becomes registered to vote by operation of this program, and that person votes or attempts to vote in an election held after the effective date of the person's registration, that person shall be presumed to have acted with official authorization and is not guilty of fraudulently voting or attempting to vote, unless that person willfully votes or attempts to vote knowing that he or she is not entitled to vote."

This specific wording is added to deal with California Probate Code Section 18100, as is noted later in the bill, describing good faith transactions with a trustee.

San Francisco Proposition N
In November 2016 voters in San Francisco approved a proposal to allow all parents of children in the San Francisco school system to vote in school board elections regardless of their immigration or citizenship status. Unless extended by the San Francisco Board of Supervisors, the proposition is only effective for the school board elections of 2018, 2020, and 2022. Voters rejected similar proposals in 2004 and 2010.

On July 29, 2022, ordinance 206-21, which allowed noncitizens to vote in San Francisco school board elections, was struck down based on a judge's interpretation of California's Constitution.

Critics, such as Florida's Agriculture Commissioner Adam Putnam, have used this proposition to generalize that noncitizens can vote in San Francisco. Former Congressmember Doug Ose has submitted a proposed ballot measure to state officials that would ban voting by those in the U.S. illegally.

San Francisco's effort to get noncitizen parents to the ballot box in mid-term elections in 2018 resulted in only 49 people signing up to vote.

Connecticut
An "act concerning voting by resident alien property owners", "to allow alien property owners to vote at town meetings and referenda", was submitted to the Connecticut General Assembly in 2003.

District of Columbia
An "Equitable Voting Rights Amendment Act" was proposed, and rejected in commission, in 2004.

Maine
LD 1195, "An Act To Allow Noncitizen Residents To Vote in Municipal Elections", was submitted to the 124th Maine Legislature in 2009 and was voted down.

Maryland
Maryland ended noncitizen voting rights for state and federal elections in 1851, but its constitution recognizes the autonomy of local municipalities and localities on the subject.

Places where noncitizens can currently vote in Maryland
As of February, 2008, one city, three towns, and three villages in Montgomery County have introduced bills to restore the right to vote to foreigners within their jurisdictions:
 Barnesville (since 1918)
 Chevy Chase Section Three and Chevy Chase Section Five
 Garrett Park (since 1999)
 Glen Echo
 Hyattsville (since December 2016)
 Martin's Additions
 Mount Rainier (since January 2017)
 Riverdale (since May 2018)
 Somerset (since 1976)
 Takoma Park (since 1993)

Massachusetts
Three municipal assemblies in the state of Massachusetts have introduced bills to confer foreigners the right to vote. The municipal assembly in the city of Newton introduced a bill to this effect in 2004, while Amherst and Cambridge did so in 1998.
However, as of February 2008, the proposals had not been approved by the state's assembly.

Minnesota
A "bill for an act relating to elections; proposing an amendment to the Minnesota Constitution, article VII, section 1; authorizing local units of government to permit permanent resident noncitizens to vote in local elections" was submitted on February 7, 2005 at the Minnesota House of Representatives.

New York

In New York City, noncitizens who have children in public schools could vote in school board elections until 2002. Since then there are no longer elected school boards.

In 2021, New York City passed a law allowing legal immigrants the right to vote in city and borough elections. This law was struck down as violating the New York State constitution, preventing it from going into effect, but as of June 2022, the city intended to appeal. Previously, bills had been submitted at the New York City Council and at the New York State Assembly in 2003, 2005, 2006 and 2010.

Ohio
Yellow Springs, Ohio passed a law by referendum in 2019, allowing non-citizens to vote in local elections. This was disallowed by Ohio Secretary of State Frank LaRose on the grounds that it was unconstitutional. The Ohio constitution was amended in 2022 to specifically exclude non-citizens from voting.

Texas
A bill was submitted by Rep. Roberto Alonzo in 1995 "proposing a constitutional amendment providing by local option for a lawfully admitted resident alien to vote in an election held by a political subdivision."

Vermont
Montpelier citizens passed a charter change on November 6, 2018 that would afford full voting rights in municipal elections to any legal non-citizens residing in the city. A similar proposal in Winooski was defeated in 2018 and passed in 2020. Approval for all localities was granted by the Vermont state legislature in June 2021, overriding the veto of Governor Phil Scott.

References

General references
 
 Hayduk, Ron (2006). Democracy for All: Restoring Immigrant Voting Rights in the United States, Routledge, 
 Hayduk, Ron (2015). "Political Rights in the Age of Migration: Lessons from the United States." Journal of International Migration & Integration. Volume 16, Issue 1, pp 99–118.

External links
 Citizen Voters, an advocacy group that tracks efforts to prevent non-citizens from voting

History of voting rights in the United States
United States
Voting